Jennifer Tham (born 1962) is a leading choir conductor and music pedagogue based in Singapore. She received a Bachelor of Arts in philosophy and sociology from the National University of Singapore in 1985, and trained to be a composer at the Simon Fraser University in Vancouver, British Columbia, Canada, where she graduated with a Bachelor of Fine Arts in music in 1995. 

She has been the artistic director and conductor with the SYC Ensemble Singers since 1986, the artistic director of the Young Musicians' Society since its incorporation as a non-profit arts company in 1996, and is also a conductor with several school choirs at the secondary and junior college levels being the main conductor for school choirs like the Dunman High School Choir and the River Valley High School Choir.

She was conferred the Young Artist Award by the National Arts Council of Singapore in 1992, and was a recipient of the Cultural Medallion in 2012.

References 

Living people
1962 births
Singaporean women
Singaporean conductors (music)
National University of Singapore alumni
Simon Fraser University alumni
Recipients of the Cultural Medallion
Singaporean people of Chinese descent
20th-century Singaporean musicians
21st-century Singaporean musicians
20th-century conductors (music)
21st-century conductors (music)